Abdoulaye M'Baye may refer to:
 Abdoulaye M'Baye (basketball)
 Abdoulaye M'Baye (footballer)